Henry Hill (1943–2012) was an ex-Mafia.

Henry Hill may also refer to:

Sportspeople 
 Henry Hill (New Zealand cricketer) (1845–1924), Welsh-born New Zealand cricketer, played for Canterbury 1873–74
 Henry Hill (cricketer, born 1851) (1851–1905), English cricketer
 Henry Hill (Yorkshire cricketer) (1858–1935), English cricketer, played for Yorkshire 1888–91
 Henry Hill (Warwickshire cricketer) (1861–1913), English cricketer, played for Warwickshire 1894–1900
 Henry Hill (Australian cricketer) (Henry John Hill, 1878–1906), Australian cricketer
 Henry Hill (American football) (born ), American football player

Others 
Henry Hill (colonial merchant) (1732-1798), American slaveholder, merchant, and politician
 Henry Hill (politician) (1826–1910), freight contractor and politician in South Australia
 Henry Hill (Medal of Honor) (1843–1908), American Civil War soldier and Medal of Honor recipient
 John Hill (businessman) (Henry John Hill, 1847–1926), South Australian coach-horse operator
 Henry Barker Hill (1849–1903), American chemist at Harvard University
 Henry Hill (educationalist) (1849–1933), New Zealand school inspector and educationalist
 Henry W. Hill (1853–1929), American politician (New York)
 Henry Root Hill (1876–1918), American brigadier general killed in battle
 Henry Hill (architect) (1913–1984), American architect
 Henry Aaron Hill (1915–1979), African American chemist
 Henry Hill (bishop) (1921–2006), Canadian Anglican Bishop of Ontario
 Henry Hill (Royal Navy officer) (1775–1849), Vice-Admiral of the Royal Navy
 Henry Erskine Hill (1864–1939), Anglican priest and author
Henry Hill (colonial merchant) (1732-1798), colonial merchant and politician
 Henry Worsley Hill (1799–1868), Royal Navy officer and Governor of the Gold Coast
 Hank Hill (Henry Rutherford Hill), a fictional character from the animated series King of the Hill
 Henry Hill (New York), a mountain in Albany County, New York

See also
 Harry Hill (disambiguation)
 Henry House Hill, scene of fighting in both the Battle of First Bull Run and the Battle of Second Bull Run
 Henry Staveley-Hill, British lawyer and politician
 Henry St. Hill (1807–1866), member of the New Zealand Legislative Council
 Henry Hill Vale (1831–1875), British architect
 Hill (surname)
 

Hill, Henry